"Champion" is the official second single from Ace Hood's second album, Ruthless.  It is a hip hop song that features Jazmine Sullivan and Rick Ross.

Music video
Gil Green, DJ Khaled, The Runners, and Dre make cameo appearances in the video.

Charts

Release history

References

2009 singles
2009 songs
Ace Hood songs
Jazmine Sullivan songs
Rick Ross songs
Def Jam Recordings singles
Song recordings produced by the Runners
Songs written by Ace Hood
Songs written by Jazmine Sullivan
Songs written by Rick Ross
Songs written by Jermaine Jackson (hip hop producer)
Songs written by Andrew Harr
Songs written by Carvin Haggins
Songs written by Ivan Barias